William Taverner (fl. 1417) was an English politician.

He was a Member (MP) of the Parliament of England for Lyme Regis in 1417.

References

Year of birth missing
15th-century deaths
Members of the Parliament of England (pre-1707) for Lyme Regis
English MPs 1417